Soda machine can refer to one of the following:
 Soda machine (home appliance)
A vending machine with soft drinks or other cold beverages; see also full-line vending.
A soda fountain.